Yanga Princess is a Tanzanian professional women's football club based in Jangwani, Dar es Salaam, Tanzania. The club features in the Tanzanian Women's Premier League. The club is affiliated to Young Africans SC who play in the Ligi Kuu Bara.

References

External links 

 Official Website
 

Young Africans S.C.
Women's football clubs in Tanzania